Betts is an English Patronymic surname, deriving from the medieval personal name Bett, a short form of Bartholomew, Beatrice, or Elizabeth. It is also the americanized spelling of German Betz. The surname may refer to
 Alejandro Jacobo Betts (1947–2020), Argentine air-traffic controller
 Arnie F. Betts (1909-1993), American politician
 Blair Betts (born 1980), Canadian ice hockey player
 Charles Betts (born 1986), American professional wrestler better known as Chad Gable
 Clive James Charles Betts (born 1950), British politician
 Connor Stephen Betts, (1995-2019), American mass murderer, perpetrator of the 2019 Dayton shooting
 Daisy Betts Miller, Australian actress
 DanielCharles Alexander Betts (born 1971), British actor
 Denis Betts (born 1969), English rugby league player
 Dickey Betts (born 1943), American guitarist, singer, and songwriter
 Edward Ladd Betts (1815–1872), English railway contractor
 Frederick Betts (1859–1944), landowner, donated Betts Park
 Gilbert Frederick Betts (1916–1982), English cricketer
 Frederick Nicholson Betts (1906–1973), British Indian Army officer and ornithologist
 Harry Betts (died 1985), jazz composer
 Jackson Edward Betts (1904–1993), Republican member of the U.S. House of Representatives from Ohio
 John Betts, several people
 Jonathan Betts (born 1955), British horological scholar
 Jonathan Betts-LaCroix, American computer company executive
 José Ángel Ramos Betts (2008-2020), Mexican school shooter who committed the Colegio Cervantes shooting
 William Thomas "Keter" Betts (1928–2005), American jazz double bassist
 Matthew Ladell Betts (born 1979), American football running back
 Leah Sarah Betts (1977–1995), English ecstasy-related death
 Louis Betts (1873–1961), American portrait painter
 Mahlon Betts (1795–1867), American carpenter, shipwright, businessman, banker
 Mathieu Betts (born 1995), Canadian-American football player
 Melvyn Betts (born 1975), English cricketer
 Markus Lynn "Mookie" Betts (born 1992), Major League baseball player
 Morton Betts (1847–1914), English sportsman
 Naomi Betts (born 1982), American criminal
 Robert Betts (born 1981), English footballer
 Roland W. Betts (born 1946), American businessman
 Captain Richard Betts, English-American Centenarian and soldier
 Sally Betts, Mayor of Waverley Council (New South Wales, Australia)
 Samuel Betts (Connecticut politician) (1660–1733), Connecticut state representative
 Samuel Betts  (1786–1868), United States congressman and federal judge from New York
 Thaddeus Betts (1789–1840), United States Senator and Lieutenant Governor from Connecticut
 Thomas Betts (1650–1717), member of the Connecticut House of Representatives
 Todd Betts (born 1973), Canadian baseball player
 Torben Betts (born 1968), English playwright and screenwriter

Betts may also refer to;
 Betts electrolytic process for separating lead and bismuth
 the Supreme Court Case Betts v. Brady
 R v Betts and Ridley, a famous case in British law
 Betts Group in Australia

See also
 Bett (disambiguation)
 Bettsville, Ohio
 Betts Park, Penge

References 

English-language surnames